The 1985 Hong Kong District Board elections were the second district board elections held on 7 March 1985 for the all 19 districts of Hong Kong (original Tsuen Wan District Board was separated into Tsuen Wan District Board and Kwai Tsing District Board).

Overview
The two political groups with long history, the Hong Kong Civic Association and the Reform Club of Hong Kong continued to fill candidates in various districts. The Reform Club focused on its base in the Eastern District and both groups focused their campaigns in the urban areas. The relatively new grassroots group, the Hong Kong People's Council on Public Housing Policy which mainly focused on the public housing policies also actively fill in candidates. The incumbent District Councillors in the Central and Western District, Eastern District and the Southern District on the Hong Kong Island formed the coalition of seeking for re-election. Most of the members retained their seats.

The pro-Beijing leftist union Hong Kong Federation of Trade Unions (FTU) also supported ten of its members who all ran as individuals and five of them were elected, while five elected candidates were with pro-Taipei background, one of whom was a member of the Hong Kong and Kowloon Trades Union Council (TUC). The Hong Kong Professional Teachers' Union (PTU) also supported 30 of its members, 24 of whom were elected.

General outcome
Total of 476,530 voters cast their votes on the election day on 7 March, which was about 37.5% of the total eligible voters, slightly higher than the last election.

|-
! style="background-color:#E9E9E9;text-align:center;" colspan=2 |Political Affiliation
! style="background-color:#E9E9E9;text-align:right;" |Votes
! style="background-color:#E9E9E9;text-align:right;" |%
! style="background-color:#E9E9E9;text-align:right;" |Standing
! style="background-color:#E9E9E9;text-align:right;" |Elected
|-
| width=1px style="background-color: " |
| style="text-align:left;" |Hong Kong Civic Association 
| 60,311 || 8.76 || 44 || 17
|-
| width=1px style="background-color: " |
| style="text-align:left;" |Reform Club of Hong Kong
| 43,769 || 6.36 || 35 || 17
|-
|style="background-color:#EE241C"|
| style="text-align:left;" | Eastern District Coalition
| 28,495 || 4.14 || 12 || 10
|-
|style="background-color:#3FA900"|
| style="text-align:left;" | Central and Western District Coalition
| 19,703 || 2.86 || 12 || 10
|-
| width=1px style="background-color: " |
| style="text-align:left;" |Hong Kong People's Council on Public Housing Policy 
| 29,390 || 4.27 || 10 || 8
|-
| width=1px style="background-color: " |
| style="text-align:left;" |Hong Kong People's Association
| 18,040 || 2.62 || 8 || 8
|-
|style="background-color:#0079C4"|
| style="text-align:left;" | Southern District Coalition
| 9,570 || 1.39 || 10 || 6
|-
| width=1px style="background-color: " |
| style="text-align:left;" |Meeting Point 
| 9,714 || 1.41 || 4 || 4
|-
|style="background-color:"|
| style="text-align:left;" |Hong Kong Affairs Society
| 4,148 || 0.60 || 3 || 3
|-
|style="background-color:"|
| style="text-align:left;" |Independent and others 
| 508,313 || 73.81 ||	 385 || 170
|-
|style="text-align:left;background-color:#E9E9E9" colspan="2"|Total (turnout 37.5%)
|style="text-align:right;background-color:#E9E9E9"|688,676
|style="text-align:right;background-color:#E9E9E9"|100.00
|style="text-align:right;background-color:#E9E9E9"|501
|style="text-align:right;background-color:#E9E9E9"|237
|}

Note: The votes of candidates with multiple affiliations are overlapped in this table.

References

 
Hong Kong
1985 in Hong Kong
1985
1985 elections in British Overseas Territories
March 1985 events in Asia